Big Walker Lookout is a  observation tower located in the Blue Ridge Highlands Region atop Big Walker Mountain in Bland County, Virginia.

Location 
The first store building burned in 2003 and a new store was built just to the right of the first. Originally, visitors crossed to the tower by way of a swinging bridge that connected to the back of the old general store. The swinging bridge was not destroyed in the fire and still stands. Visitors can cross to the edge where the original staircase connected to the bridge.

Big Walker Lookout hosts traditional arts demonstrations on weekends. The lookout tower is open to the public with payment of an admission fee.

Views 

History 

The tower was originally built in 1947 and has been run continuously by the Kime family. According to the Virginia Department of Tourism, the tower is located at a mountain pass used by Molly Tynes, a woman who warned the town of Wytheville of impending raids by John Toland during the Civil War. The tower is the beginning of a Virginia Civil War Trails driving tour detailing the Battle of Wytheville, which occurred on July 18, 1863 when "a Federal raiding party marched to the Wytheville area intending to destroy the Virginia and Tennessee Railroad tracks and bridges". Troops also hoped to destroy key telegraph lines and damage nearby salt mines and lead mines.

Thanks in part to the warnings brought by Tynes, the battle was largely unsuccessful for the Union forces. "After some skirmishing and confusion on the advance, Union Col. John Toland ordered his men into Wytheville. Hastily organized Confederate resistance succeeded in killing Toland in the street and limiting the damage to the railroad track and stock. The raid did not succeed in its mission as the track was quickly repaired".

Wildlife 

Big Walker Lookout Tower is a stop on Virginia Birding and Wildlife Trail's Big Walker Loop.

Birds sighted at the Big Walker Lookout include: wild turkey; black vultures; bald eagles and golden eagles; American kestrels; peregrine falcons; and sharp-shinned, Cooper's hawks, broad-winged, and red-tailed hawks.

References

External links 

 
 Virginia Civil War Trails

Landmarks in Virginia
Buildings and structures in Bland County, Virginia
Tourist attractions in Bland County, Virginia